West Virginia Route 3 is a state highway in the U.S. state of West Virginia. It runs from West Virginia Route 10 in West Hamlin in a general easterly direction via Beckley to West Virginia Route 311 at Sweet Springs, most of the way across the state.

Route 3 crosses a particularly large part of the state's landscape. It goes through many counties including Monroe, Greenbrier, Summers, Raleigh, Boone, and Lincoln. At least two state parks are along the route. Moncove Lake State Park, in the southeastern part of the state, is just a few miles off the main road near Gap Mills. Little Beaver State Park is in Beaver, near the major city of Beckley.

WV 3 overlaps U.S. Route 119 in Boone County north of Madison and U.S. Route 219 from Union north to Pickaway.

Major intersections

References

003
West Virginia Route 003
West Virginia Route 003
West Virginia Route 003
West Virginia Route 003
West Virginia Route 003
West Virginia Route 003